Kazi Sharif Kaikobad is a former major general in the Bangladesh Army. He is the former director general of Bangladesh Ansar and the Village Defence Party.

Career 
Kaikobad was commissioned in Bangladesh Army on December 21, 1984 in the Corps of Artillery with 11th BMA long Course. He was the first resident high commissioner to Nigeria. Previously he was assigned as Managing Director, Bangladesh Machine Tools Factory Limited. He also served as Senior Directing Staff of National Defence College, Mirpur. He was instructor at Bangladesh Military Academy and Artillery Centre & School. He commanded three BGB battalions, two artillery regiments and two artillery brigades(9 artillery brigade & 55 artillery brigade) . He was deployed in United Nations Mission in Bosnia & Herzegovina and United Nations Mission in Ethiopia and Eritrea.

He graduated from University of Chittagong. He is a graduate of Defence Services Command and Staff College, Mirpur and also completed National Defence Course at National Defence College, Mirpur.

Kaikobad was appointed as the first resident High Commissioner to Nigeria from Bangladesh.

References 

Living people
Bangladesh Army generals
High Commissioners of Bangladesh to Nigeria
1970 births